Dejan Gluščević (born June 21, 1967) is a Montenegrin former footballer and manager.

Playing career

Club
Gluščević made his debut in professional football playing with FK Radnički Beograd in the 1990–91 Yugoslav Second League. He scored an impressive 13 goals in 25 appearances. The next year, due to the break-up of Yugoslavia, Radnički played in the 1991–92 Yugoslav First League and impressed again by scoring 15 goals in 28 appearances. Gluscevic was transferred by Red Star Belgrade to Proodeftiki F.C. of the Beta Ethnic in 1992, but due to the club's financial constraints he went back to the Yugoslav First League's Proleter Zrenjanin FC and helped them to qualify for the Yugoslav Cup quarterfinals. 

In 1994, he went to Indonesia to sign with Pelita Jaya FC and played in the AFC Champion's Cup tournament against Ilhwa Chuma from South Korea. After Pelita Jaya FC was eliminated from Champion's Cup, Dejan was loaned to Bandung Raya of the Liga Indonesia Premier Division, where he won the league title and finished as the league's top goalscorer with 30 goals. After scoring a hat-trick in AFC Cup of Winners Cup In 1997, he returned to rivals Pelita Jaya. to support "FA Primavera project" with young indonesian internationals. In 1999, after Indonesian League was stopped due to political issues, he went to Singapore to sign with Tanjong Pagar United FC of the S.League and as a team top scorer. 

In 2000, he went to Canada to sign with the Montreal Impact of the USL A-League. He appeared in four matches and recorded two goals.  After Montreal released him from his contract due to the club's financial constrains. On May 23, 2001 the North York Astros of the Canadian Professional Soccer League signed Gluscevic In 2002, North York appointed him head coach. He managed to lead the club to the CPSL Championship finals against Ottawa Wizards, but were defeated by a score of 2-0. In 2005, he returned to coach the Astros, and clinched them a postseason berth. The league awarded him with the CPSL Coach of the Year award.

Managerial career 
In 2002, North York Astros appointed him as their new head coach . Throughout the season he managed to lead the club to the CPSL Championship finals against Ottawa Wizards, but were defeated by a score of 2-0. In 2005, he returned to coach the Astros, and clinched them a postseason berth. As a result for his achievement the league awarded him with the CPSL Coach of the Year award. During his tenure in Canada he was employed by the Ontario Soccer Association, where he achieved a silver medal with the Ontario U-15 team in 2002, and another silver medal in 2005 with the U-14 team.  

In 2005, he returned to Serbia to manage the youth sides of Red Star Belgrade, and Rad Belgrade. In 2010, he was hired by the Football Association of Singapore in order to coach the Singapore U-15 national team. In 2017, he was appointed the manager for the Vanuatu national under-20 football team. In 2018, he served as an assistant coach for FK Zemun in the Serbian SuperLiga.

Honours

Player
Zemun
 Serbian Republic League: 1987–88

Bandung Raya FC
 Liga Indonesia Premier Division: 1995–96

Individual
 Liga Indonesia Premier Division top scorers: 1995–96

Manager
Singapore U-15
 AFF U-16 Youth Championship fourth place: 2011

References  

1967 births
Living people
Association football forwards
Yugoslav footballers
Serbia and Montenegro footballers
FK Zemun players
FK Čukarički players
FK Radnički Beograd players
Proodeftiki F.C. players
FK Proleter Zrenjanin players
Pelita Jaya FC players
Bandung Raya players
Tanjong Pagar United FC players
Montreal Impact (1992–2011) players
North York Astros players
Yugoslav Second League players
Yugoslav First League players
Football League (Greece) players
First League of Serbia and Montenegro players
Liga 1 (Indonesia) players
Singapore Premier League players
A-League (1995–2004) players
Canadian Soccer League (1998–present) players
Serbia and Montenegro expatriate footballers
Expatriate footballers in Greece
Serbia and Montenegro expatriate sportspeople in Greece
Expatriate footballers in Indonesia
Serbia and Montenegro expatriate sportspeople in Indonesia
Expatriate footballers in Singapore
Montenegrin expatriate sportspeople in Singapore
Expatriate soccer players in Canada
Serbia and Montenegro football managers
Montenegrin football managers
North York Astros coaches
Canadian Soccer League (1998–present) managers
Montenegrin expatriate football managers
Expatriate soccer managers in Canada
Expatriate football managers in Singapore
Expatriate football managers in Vanuatu